Rudolf Walther-Fein (20 November 1875 – 1 May 1933) was an Austrian film director and producer of the Silent and early sound era. He directed the first full sound film to be released in Germany It's You I Have Loved in 1929.

Selected filmography
 Only One Night (1922)
 The Big Thief (1922)
 Bigamy (1922)
 William Tell (co-director: Rudolf Dworsky, 1923)
 The Treasure of Gesine Jacobsen (1923)
 The Little Duke (1924)
 In the Valleys of the Southern Rhine (co-director: Rudolf Dworsky, 1925)
 Lightning (1925)
 The Adventurers (1926)
 The Laughing Husband (co-director: Rudolf Dworsky, 1926)
 Kissing Is No Sin (co-director: Rudolf Dworsky, 1926)
 Vienna, How it Cries and Laughs (co-director: Rudolf Dworsky, 1926)
 The Fallen (co-director: Rudolf Dworsky, 1926)
 Weekend Magic (1927)
 Circle of Lovers (co-director: Rudolf Dworsky, 1927)
 Carnival Magic (co-director: Rudolf Dworsky, 1927)
 Darling of the Dragoons (1928)
 Robert and Bertram (1928)
 Marriage (1928)
 The Carnival Prince (1928)
 Youth of the Big City (1929)
 Foolish Happiness (1929)
 The Black Domino (1929)
 It's You I Have Loved (1929)
 Hungarian Nights (1929)
 Queen of Fashion (1929)
 Gentlemen Among Themselves (1929)
 Danube Waltz (1930)
 Der Korvettenkapitän (1930)
 The Fate of Renate Langen (1931)
 My Heart Longs for Love (1931)

References

Bibliography
 Kreimeier, Klaus. The Ufa story: a history of Germany's greatest film company, 1918-1945. University of California Press, 1999.

External links

1875 births
1933 deaths
Austrian film directors
Austrian film producers
Film people from Vienna
Austrian emigrants to Germany